Apollo 440 (also known as Apollo Four Forty or @440) are a British electronic music group formed in Liverpool in 1990. The group has written, recorded, and produced five studio albums, collaborated with and produced other artists, remixed as Apollo 440 and as ambient cinematic alter-ego Stealth Sonic Orchestra, and created music for film, television, advertisements and multimedia. They notched up ten UK top 40 singles with three top-tens, and had a chart presence worldwide.

Its name comes from the Apollo program and the frequency of concert pitch — the A note at 440 Hz, often denoted as "A440", and the Sequential Circuits sampler/sequencer, the Studio 440. They changed the writing of their name from Apollo 440 to Apollo Four Forty in 1996, though they switched back for their latest album. To date, Apollo 440's remixes range from U2, P. Diddy/Jimmy Page, Jean-Michel Jarre and Ennio Morricone. Among their Stealth Sonic Orchestra remixes are a series of Manic Street Preachers singles.

History 

Apollo 440 were formed by the brothers Trevor and Howard Gray with fellow Liverpudlians Noko and James Gardner. 
Trevor, Howard and Noko all attended the same school, Old Hall High School in Maghull, in the mid to late 1970's.
Gardner left after the recording of the first album. All members sing and add a profusion of samples, electronics, and computer-based sounds.

After relocating to the Camden area of London, Apollo 440 recorded in 1994 with their debut album, Millennium Fever, and released it on 30 January 1995 on their own Stealth Sonic Recordings label (distributed by Epic Records). Their combination of rock, breakbeat, and ambient music has been successful on the record charts as well as on the dance floor.

The band had been most known for its remixes until the release of Liquid Cool in the UK. However, it was not until the success of the singles "Krupa" and "Ain't Talkin' 'bout Dub" that their own musical efforts were brought to international attention – particularly the latter single contributed to pushing Apollo 440 into the spotlight.

In 2007, the band played a tribute gig to the late Billy Mackenzie.

Apollo 440's fifth album, The Future's What It Used To Be, became available for download on the iTunes Store from 23 March 2012.

Collaborators over the years have included Jeff Beck, Jean Michel Jarre, Billy Mackenzie, Ian McCulloch and Tomoyasu Hotei.

Currently, the band resides in Islington, London, having once again moved its headquarters.

Members

Current members
 Howard Gray - production keyboards, samples, programming  (1990–present)
 Trevor Gray - production, keyboards, samples, programming (1990–present)
 Noko - production, vocals, guitars, keyboards, samples, programming (1990–present)

Former members
 James Gardner - bass, keyboards, programming, samples (1990–1993)

Current touring members
 Cliff Hewitt - drums, programming (1994-present)
 Mary Byker (Ian Hoxley) - vocals. raps (1997-present)
 Harry K - turntables, samples, keyboards (1997-present)
 Michael Cusick - bass, backing vocals (2007-present)
 Ewan MacFarlane - vocals (2007-present)

Former touring members
 MC Stevie Hyper D - raps (1994)
 Rhoda Dakar - vocals (1994-2004)
 Paul Kodish - drums, programming (1997-2000)
 Rej - bass (1997-2000)
 Jonathan "Stan" White - bass (2004)

Discography

Albums

EPs
Rumble EP (1993)
 A Deeper Dub EP (2011)

Singles

Media appearances
Over 50 different Apollo tracks have featured in movies, trailers, TV, games and ads worldwide, the latter including globally branded cars, beers, soft drinks, phones, audio and software. They have also written two entire soundtracks for the Sony PlayStation and provided the themes for ITV World Cup '98 and Formula 1 2000 to 2002 coverage as well as Liverpool F.C.'s Official 2006 FA Cup song.

Video games
 1996 Adidas Power Soccer (PlayStation version) - Rumble/Spirit of America
1997 Rapid Racer (Turbo Prop Racing), format: PlayStation CD (Audio CD plus game data track). The soundtrack was also available as an extra CD, as part of the limited edition double CD single release of "Carrera Rapida"
 1999 FIFA 2000 - Stop the Rock
 1999 Gran Turismo 2 (NTSC version) - Cold Rock the Mic 
 2000 Spider-Man (2000), featured a remix of "Spider-Man theme song"
 2001 ATV Offroad Fury - Yo! Future
 2001 Gran Turismo 3: A-Spec (NTSC version) - Stop the Rock (Mint Royale Mix) 
 2002 F1 2002 (PS2 and PC versions) - Blackbeat 
 2003 SX Superstar - Cold Rock the Mic 
 2004 EyeToy: AntiGrav - ???
 2004 EyeToy: Groove -  Hustler Groove (instrumental)
 2004 Gran Turismo 4 - Start the Car
 2004 Gran Turismo 4 - Hold the Brakes
 2007 Forza Motorsport 2 - SolidRockRazorSteel
 2007 Forza Motorsport 2 - Rollin' Down the Highway
 2007 Cars Mater-National Championship - Stop The Rock
 2012 LittleBigPlanet Karting  - Odessa Dubstep (Instrumental)

Music in film
 Spawn (1997) the soundtrack : "This Is Not A Dream" (UK Mix), with Mark Sandman of Morphine on vocals
Spawn Bonus Track (#15-16)
 Club Hits 97/98 (1997), (soundtrack to music used during Sky Sport's coverage of Premiership football), featured "Ain't Talkin' 'bout Dub"
 Species II (1998), featured "Carrera Rapido"
 Lost in Space (1998), featured "Lost In Space (Theme)"
 Charlie's Angels (2000), featured a remix of the Charlies Angels theme song
 Boys and Girls (2000), featured "Stop the Rock" in a club scene
 Cut (2000), featured "Stop the Rock"
 Gone in 60 Seconds (2000), featured "Stop the Rock"
 Driven (2001), features "Stadium Parking Lot" in a montage of several songs during a chase scene
 Spider-Man (2002), featured "Altamont Super-Highway Revisited" in one of the trailers
 Resident Evil (2002), featured "Wall Of Death"
 S.W.A.T. (2003), featured "Time Is Running Out"
 Eurotrip (2004), featured "Make My Dreams Come True"
 Chasing Liberty (2004) featured "Stop the Rock"
 Disaster Movie (2008), featured "Stop the Rock" in the teaser trailer
 The Sopranos, in "Whoever Did This" (2002) "The Man with the Harmonica" played over the end credits
 Victoria's Secret Fashion Show 2007, featured "Stop the Rock" in the segment "Sureally Sexy"

Vocalists
Apollo 440 has a history of working with various vocalists. Whilst their debut album, Millennium Fever, was sung almost exclusively by Noko, he has since withdrawn from his vocalist status in the band to make way for various guest appearances, including, but not limited to:
Billy Mackenzie on "Pain In Any Language" on Electro Glide in Blue, the last song he recorded.
Ewan MacFarlane on "Electro Glide in Blue" on Electro Glide In Blue and numerous tracks on the Dude Descending a Staircase album - currently performing live.
Xan on "Something's Got to Give" on Dude Descending a Staircase
Jalal Nuriddin on "Children of the Future" on Dude Descending a Staircase
The Beatnuts on the title track of Dude Descending a Staircase
Elizabeth Gray on "Christiane" on Dude Descending a Staircase and "Stealth Mass" on Electro Glide in Blue
Mary Byker (Ian Hoxley) on "Ain't Talkin' 'bout Dub", "Raw Power" on Electro Glide in Blue and "Stop The Rock" on Gettin' High On Your Own Supply - performed as live vocalist until 2004.

Tributes

Jean Baudrillard
The album, Millennium Fever, is a tribute to the French philosopher Jean Baudrillard. Since the release of that album, other references to Jean Baudrillard's works have popped up.
The track, "Astral America", references Baudrillard's America essay, where the term originates.
The track, "The Perfect Crime", references Baudrillard's book of the same name.
The lyrics of "Stealth Requiem" reference the Baudrillardian concept of hyperreality. At one point a female voice says, "Ravishing hyperrealism ... Mind blowing", and later quotes directly from America (1988): "The exhilaration of obscenity; the obscenity of obviousness; the obviousness of power; the power of simulation."

Marcel Duchamp
The title and cover art of the album Dude Descending a Staircase are parodies of Nude Descending a Staircase, No. 2 by Marcel Duchamp.

Alcor
The song "Liquid Cool" (released as a B-side in 1993, as a single in 1994, and featured on the Millennium Fever album) is a tribute to Alcor, a company focused to pursue research into and the organization of cryonization. The topic is also referenced in the title-song "Millennium Fever", which includes the line, '"I've been dreaming of freezing my mind in California'" where Alcor was based until 1994.
Contact details for Alcor subsequently appeared on the sleeve of the single "(Don't Fear) The Reaper", a cover of the Blue Öyster Cult song.

Omega Point
The song "Omega Point" references the religious concept of the same name, and features a quote from Barrow and Tipler's "The Anthropic Cosmological Principle".

Krupa
Their 1996 song is a homage to the Polish-American drummer Gene Krupa and his improvised style of drumming.

Charles Bukowski
On the album Electro Glide in Blue, track 6 called "Tears of the Gods" (6:18) features audio quotes from the 1970s video performance "Bukowski at Bellevue".  The quotes are all taken from a piece entitled "Soup, Cosmos, and Tears."  (A transcription of the video can be found at the Blithering Savant blog.)

Slavoj Žižek
The song "Love is Evil", on the album The Future's What It Used to Be, contains samples from the Slovenian philosopher Slavoj Žižek.

References

External links
The Stealthography

English electronic rock musical groups
English techno music groups
British drum and bass music groups
Musical groups from Liverpool
Remixers
Musical groups established in 1990
English alternative rock groups
Big beat groups
550 Music artists
Epic Records artists